Ovation is a 2015 American comedy drama film written by Henry Jaglom and Ron Vignone, directed by Jaglom and starring Tanna Frederick and James Denton.

Cast
Tanna Frederick as Maggie Chase
James Denton as Stewart Henry
Stephanie Fredricks as Sybil Edwards
Cathy Arden as Rosalind Goodman
Simon Jaglom as Michael 'Mouse' Lambert

Release
The film premiered at the Santa Fe Film Festival in December 2015.

Reception
The film has a 38% rating on Rotten Tomatoes based on eight reviews.

Jeannette Catsoulis of The New York Times gave the film a positive review and wrote, "Dependably genuine, and suffused with Mr. Jaglom’s increasingly mellow intelligence, this lighthearted backstage drama will feel to his fans like a gathering of familiars."

Katie Walsh of the Los Angeles Times also gave the film a positive review and wrote, "Ovation is a loving tribute to the theater, to the intoxicating power of live performance and to the bond among performers and crew, from the lighting guy in the booth down to the star on the stage."

Walter Addiego of the San Francisco Chronicle gave the film a negative review and wrote, "You may get the sense you’ve wandered into a super-intense acting class or someone’s therapy session — a hothouse atmosphere that’s oppressive."

References

External links
 
 

Films directed by Henry Jaglom